Elections to Flintshire County Council took place in 2017.

By-elections

Penyffordd

References 

2017 Welsh local elections
Flintshire County Council elections